The 1948 United States Senate election in Montana took place on November 2, 1948. Incumbent United States Senator James E. Murray, who was first elected to the Senate in a special election in 1934 and was re-elected in 1936 and 1942, ran for re-election. After winning the Democratic primary, he faced Tom J. Davis, an attorney and the Republican nominee, in the general election. Following a narrow re-election in 1936, Murray significantly expanded his margin of victory and comfortably won re-election over Davis, resulting in him winning his fourth term and his third full term in the Senate.

Democratic primary

Candidates
James E. Murray, incumbent United States Senator
Harry J. McGregor

Results

Republican primary

Candidates
Tom J. Davis, attorney, former President of Rotary International
Wellington D. Rankin, former United States Attorney for the District of Montana, former Attorney General of Montana

Results

General election

Results

See also 
 United States Senate elections, 1948 and 1949

References

Montana
1948
1948 Montana elections